The Women's team normal hill competition at the FIS Nordic World Ski Championships 2021 was held on 26 February 2021.

Results
The first round was started at 17:15 and the final round at 18:20.

References

Women's team normal hill